Saverio Tomasella is a French psychoanalyst, researcher and writer, born in Saint-Cloud, near Paris, in 1966, Doctor in Management (2002), Doctor of Psychology and Psychopathology (2016).

Work and research 
In 2004, he founded the CERP (Centre d’Études et de Recherches en Psychanalyse).

Publications
Tomasella is the author of articles and books on psychoanalysis.

Research articles
 "L’étrangéisation ou le hors-sujet de la catastrophe", Le Coq-héron, 2018/2, n° 233, p. 76-85. (DOI 10.3917/cohe.233.0076)	
 "Resubjectivations après une catastrophe ou la subjectivité dévastée", Psychologie Clinique, 2017/1, n° 43, p. 123-133. (DOI 10.1051/psyc/201743123)
 "Desubjectivation, Resubjectivation and Collective Resilience in Disasters Situation: The Exile of European and Jewish Populations of the Maghreb. A commentary.", Trauma & Acute Care, vol. 2, n° 1:34, 2017.
 "L’objet b ou le besoin comme nécessité", Psychotropes, vol. 22, N. 1, 2016, p. 31–48.
 "Trauma, deuil et principe d’intégrité", L'Évolution psychiatrique, vol. 81, N. 3, mai 2015, p. 641–652 (DOI 10.1016/j.evopsy.2015.05.004)
 "Je l’ai tellement dans la peau que j’en deviens marteau", Psychotropes, vol. 20, N. 1, 2014, p. 135–151 (DOI 10.3917/psyt.201.0135)
 "Les marques", Virtuel, Adolescences, N. 47, 22 (1), Paris, mars 2004, p. 59–66.
 "Le psychanalyste, le groupe et l'inconscient : quelle place pour être sujet ?", Autour du psychodrame, Le Coq-Héron, N. 217, Toulouse, juin 2014, p. 122–126.
 "Le trauma et ses répercussions somato-psychiques ou la pensée interrompue", Avec Ferenczi à Budapest, Le Coq-Héron, N. 212, Toulouse, mars 2013, p. 85–95.
 "Conscience et fragilité", Sous le sceau du corps, Le Coq-Héron, N. 203, Toulouse, décembre 2010, p. 97–107.
 "Haine, envie, jalousie : psychanalyse du désastre", Erich Fromm : un psychanalyste hors norme, Le Coq-Héron, N. 182, Toulouse, octobre 2005.
 "Extension ou extinction des feux : de l'essaim au courrant d'affects", Entre pratique et théorie, Le Coq-Héron, N. 176, Toulouse, mars 2004.
 "L’homéo-érotisme ou quête affective du même", Le Coq-Héron, Toulouse, mars 2001.
 "L'inconscient, un ailleurs pour l'entreprise", Un certain autre regard, N. 2, IPM, 2013, p. 117–120.
 De pouvoirs en capacités, Hermétisme, Paris, mars 2006.
 "Attendre, tendre : la patience, accueil de l’étrange", Epistolettre, N. 26, Paris, Fédération des ateliers de psychanalyse, 2004.
 "Silence ou mutisme", Epistolettre, N. 20, Paris, FAP, 1999.
 "L'école buissonnière", "Un chemin", "La frayeur de l'enfant trop sage", Epistolettre, N. 19, Paris, FAP, 1998.
 "Hamlet ou le féminin retrouvé", Les années paradoxes, Paris, Experts, décembre 1999, p. 74–77.

Books
 Main dans la main vers un monde plus sensible (written with Flora Gavand, Alban Bourdy and Christine Leclerc-Sherling, PhD), Fernand Lanore, Paris, 2021.
 Ultrasensibles au travail, Eyrolles, Paris, 2019.
 La subjectivité face au désastre, L'Harmattan, Paris, 2018.
 Ces amitiés qui nous transforment, Eyrolles, Paris, 2018.
 Derrière le mur coule une rivière. Le roman initiatique du lâcher-prise, Leduc, Paris, 2018.
 J'aide mon enfant hypersensible à s’épanouir, Leduc, Paris, 2018.
 Attention cœurs fragiles, Eyrolles, Paris, 2018.
 La marque chez le psychanalyste, Bréal, Paris, 2018.
 A fleur de peau. Le roman initiatique des hypersensibles, Leduc, Paris, 2017.
 Le syndrome de Calimero, Albin Michel, 2017.
 Petites peurs ou grosses terreurs, Leduc, Paris, 2016.
 Les relations fusionnelles, Eyrolles, Paris, 2016.
 La folie cachée, Albin Michel, Paris, 2015.
 Renaître après un traumatisme, Eyrolles, Paris, (2011), 2015. (Prix Nicolas Abraham et Maria Torok 2012)
 L'emprise affective – Sortir de sa prison, Eyrolles, Paris, 2014.
 Pour Brigitte. Six poèmes sur des peintures d'Alain Boullet, Alain Boullet, Nice, 2014.
 Hypersensibles – Trop sensibles pour être heureux ?, Eyrolles, Paris, 2012.
 Le transfert – Pour qui me prenez-vous ?, Eyrolles, Paris, 2012.
 Les amours impossibles – Accepter d'aimer et d'être aimé, Eyrolles, Paris, 2011.
 L'inconscient – Qui suis-je sur l'autre scène ?, Eyrolles, Paris, 2011.
 Le chant des songes, Les éditions Persée, Aix-en-Provence, 2010.
 La perversion – Renverser le monde, Eyrolles, Paris, 2010.
 Le sentiment d'abandon – Se libérer du passé pour exister par soi-même, Eyrolles, Paris, 2010.
 Le surmoi – Il faut, je dois, Eyrolles, Paris, 2009.
 Vivre en relation – S'ouvrir et rencontrer l'autre, Eyrolles, Paris, 2006.
 Habiter son corps, Eyrolles, Paris, 2006.
 Les configurations familiales atypiques et leurs implications humaines, Eyrolles, Paris, février 2006.
 Personne n’est parfait ! Accepter ses différences, Eyrolles, Paris, 2005.
 Faire la paix avec soi-même, Eyrolles, Paris, 2004.
 D'amour tendre, Édition des écrivains, Paris, 1999.

References

External links
 Observatory

1966 births
Living people
French psychoanalysts